Mirny is a rural locality (a settlement) in Alyoshnikovskoye Rural Settlement, Zhirnovsky District, Volgograd Oblast, Russia. The population was 57 as of 2010.

Geography 
Mirny is located in forest steppe of Volga Upland, 49 km east of Zhirnovsk (the district's administrative centre) by road. Novinka is the nearest rural locality.

References 

Rural localities in Zhirnovsky District